Staunton Creek Nullah is a nullah in Hong Kong, located in Wong Chuk Hang, in the Southern District of Hong Kong Island. The stream is in the east of the valley near Mount Cameron starting from Aberdeen Sports Ground as an artificial open channel, flowing along Heung Yip Road at Aberdeen Typhoon Shelter (Aberdeen Channel).

See also
 List of rivers and nullahs in Hong Kong

References 

Wong Chuk Hang
Rivers of Hong Kong